In France, the term Gaullist Party is usually used to refer to the largest party professing to be Gaullist. Gaullism claims to transcend the left–right divide in a similar way to populist republican parties elsewhere such as Fianna Fáil in Republic of Ireland, the Justicialist Party in Argentina, and the African National Congress in South Africa.

In the past, some Gaullist voters saw themselves as leaning towards the political left, a view ascribed to the once-leading Gaullist André Malraux. Most of Charles de Gaulle's own followers leaned towards the political right or national conservative. Consequently, left-leaning voters started showing less support again after Malraux's death in 1976, as figures of the Gaullist left (like Jacques Chaban-Delmas) were gradually marginalised. Under its various names and acronyms, the Gaullist Party has been the dominant organisation of the French right since the beginning of the Fifth Republic (1958).

De Gaulle vs. the parties (1944–1947) 
Author of the L'Appel of 18 June 1940, and founder and leader of the Free French Forces, General Charles de Gaulle is the symbol of the French Resistance to the Nazi occupation and the Vichy government. Yet, based in London, then in Algiers, he was forced to compromise with the domestic Resistance movements dominated by various political forces (such as the Communists). In 1944, while France was liberated, De Gaulle presided over the provisional government composed of Communists, Socialists, and Christian Democrats. Because De Gaulle refused to create a great political party unifying the non-Communist Resistance, a lot of parties re-emerged. The Christian democratic Popular Republican Movement (MRP) seemed to be the closest to De Gaulle.

The provisional government implemented policies inspired by the programme of the National Council of Resistance: nationalization of banks and some industrial companies (for example Renault), and the development of a Welfare State. However, it was divided about the way forward for political institutions and the constitution for the Fourth Republic. For De Gaulle, the "regime of the parties" that had characterized the Third Republic was a cause of the 1940 military disaster. He advocated a strong executive power, governing in the national interest, led by a man who was an incarnation of national unity. Indeed, in his mind, France is strong when it is united and the parties, represented in Parliament, serve particular interests and thus express national divisions.

In November 1945, a large majority of the French voters accepted the elaboration of a new Constitution. At the same time, they elected a new National Assembly. The French Communist Party, the Socialist French Section of the Workers' International (SFIO) and the Christian democratic MRP were the largest forces represented in this Assembly. It re-elected de Gaulle as president of the provisional government but, disagreeing with restoration of the "regime of the parties", de Gaulle resigned in January 1946.

In May 1946, a first constitutional law was rejected by referendum. One month later, a new Assembly was elected in order to write a new constitutional text. In his Bayeux Manifesto, De Gaulle outlined his institutional ideas but he was accused of wanting re-establish a Bonapartist government. Furthermore, without the support of a political force, he could not influence the constitutional law being prepared. René Capitant founded a Gaullist Union for the Fourth Republic but it could not prevent the approval of the text prepared by the elected Assembly, which restored the parliamentary system.

Gaullist Party and Fourth Republic: opposition and desert crossing (1947–1958) 

In 1947, he gathered the anti-Communist opposition in the Rally of the French People (Rassemblement du peuple français or RPF). He accused the Fourth Republic of being dominated by the "parliamentary fiddles" and to organize the state helplessness. In keeping with its strongly nationalist stance, it accused the French Communist Party of being a vassal of the Soviet Union. Furthermore, it denounced what it called the "abandonment" of colonies by the Third Force cabinets, and it viewed French participation in the European Economic Community to be a threat to the nation. In addition, the Gaullists recommended an association between capital and labour in order to end the "struggle of classes", which hampered national unity.

Six months after its founding, membership of the RPF reached one million. It took control of the executive of many cities, including Paris, Marseille and Bordeaux. After the 1951 legislative election and in despite of the change of the ballot system, the RPF formed the largest parliamentary group of the Assembly. But it made a systematic opposition.

In 1952, some RPF deputies voted in favour of Antoine Pinay's cabinet then joined the majority, against the instructions of De Gaulle. They left the RPF parliamentary group. More and more divided, the RPF suffered a significant decrease in support in the 1953 local elections. On 6 May 1953, De Gaulle asked to the Gaullist deputies to abandon the name "RPF". One month later, 5 Gaullist deputies joined Joseph Laniel's government. Indeed, they participated to right-wing majorities then, a part of the Gaullists as Jacques Chaban-Delmas joined the center-left Republican Front under the label National Centre of Social Republicans (Centre national des républicains sociaux or CNRS).

At the end of the 1950s, the Fourth Republic floundered in the Algerian War. The 13 May 1958 crisis led to turmoil, and a threat of military coup was brandished. Emissaries sent by de Gaulle such as Jacques Soustelle participated in this bustle. The National Assembly accepted to call back De Gaulle to lead the cabinet. On 28 September, a new constitution was approved by referendum and the Fifth Republic was born. The parliamentary system was not questioned, but the presidential function was enhanced.

Gaullist Party's height (1958–1976) 

In order that he should not be faced with an hostile Assembly, dominated by the parties (as was the case in 1945–1946), De Gaulle let his followers organize a political party, the Union for the New Republic (Union pour la nouvelle république or UNR). After the November 1958 legislative election, it became the largest force in the political system. It was allied with center-left and center-right parties to support De Gaulle, who was elected President of France by a congress of local and national elects in December 1958. Michel Debré was nominated as Prime minister.

However, the change of Algerian policy divided the party. The chairman of the National Assembly Jacques Chaban-Delmas considered Algeria was a part of the presidential "reserved domain", as well as foreign and military affairs. Soustelle, leader of the pro-French Algeria faction in the party, left the cabinet in 1960, then was ejected from the UNR. He joined Georges Bidault at the head of the Organisation armée secrète which perpetrated terrorist attacks. After this crisis, the UNR appeared as the party of de Gaulle's unconditional supporters, hence its reputation of "boot party". Debré theorized its function of strap of the government. With De Gaulle refusing to be a party leader, Debré covertly took this position.

Meanwhile, the center-left parties returned to the opposition in 1959, followed in 1962 by the center-right parties, who criticized the eurosceptic declarations of De Gaulle and the "presidentialisation". Indeed, De Gaulle instituted presidential election by universal suffrage, defying all the political forces (except UNR). The French voters approved this by referendum. De Gaulle had intended to replace Debré with Georges Pompidou as Prime minister but this was denied by a vote of no-confidence. De Gaulle dissolved the National Assembly. Associated with the left-wing Gaullists of the Democratic Union of Labour (Union démocratique du travail or UDT), and allied with Valéry Giscard d'Estaing's Independent Republicans, the UNR won the 1962 legislative election and Pompidou was confirmed to lead the cabinet.

Naturally, the UNR/UDT supported De Gaulle's candidature at the 1965 presidential election. But he won only after a second ballot, which he considered as a disavowal. Relations became more difficult with the only allied party in the presidential majority, the Independent Republicans, while the opposition was reconstructed.

While the Democratic Center intensified its criticism, some Christian-Democrats, such Maurice Schumann, joined the Gaullist Party, renamed Union of Democrats for the Fifth Republic (Union des démocrates pour la Cinquième République or UD-Ve). Prime Minister Pompidou led the party during the 1967 legislative campaign. He encouraged the emergence of a new generation of Gaullist politicians who were loyal to him. The incumbent parliamentary majority only just won.

One year later, Gaullist power was confronted with the social and student May 1968 crisis. Although the newly renamed Union for the Defense of the Republic (Union pour la défense de la République or UDR) triumphed at the June 1968 legislative election, disagreements had appeared between De Gaulle and Pompidou. Pompidou reproached De Gaulle for leaving the country without informing him, during the crisis. For De Gaulle, his project of association between capital and labour could prevent this sort of social crisis, but Pompidou wished to scrap it. Indeed, for De Gaulle's circle, Pompidou was more a classical conservative than a real Gaullist.

Pompidou left the leadership of the cabinet in order to prepare his future presidential campaign. In this, he declared his candidacy if De Gaulle were to resign. That was the case in 1969, after the failure of the referendum about Senate and regional reform, and he won the 1969 presidential election despite the reluctance of some of the "barons of Gaullism".

His Prime Minister Jacques Chaban-Delmas announced a reform programme for a "New Society". It raised sceptical reactions from the conservative wing of the UDR, then from Pompidou himself. They reproached him for giving too many concessions to the left-wing opposition. In President Pompidou's circle, he was accused of wanting to weaken the presidential functions in favour of himself. The party became the Union of Democrats for the Republic (Union des démocrates pour la République) while this crisis broke out. Pompidou refused Chaban-Delmas a vote of confidence in the National Assembly and, when he held it anyway, Pompidou forced him to resign and nominated Pierre Messmer. The UDR, allied with the Independent Republicans and Centre, Democracy and Progress, won the 1973 legislative election and succeeded in blocking the "Union of the Left" and its Common Programme.

When Pompidou died in office, on 2 April 1974, his two former Prime Ministers, Chaban-Delmas and Messmer, claimed the UDR candidacy for the presidential election. Finally, the latter withdrew, but some influential personalities in the party, notably in the circle of the late president, doubted of the capacity of Chaban-Delmas to defeat François Mitterrand, the representative of the "Union of the Left". Behind the young minister Jacques Chirac, a former adviser of Pompidou, they published the Call of the 43. They covertly supported Valéry Giscard d'Estaing, Minister of Economy and the Independent Republicans's leader. Giscard eliminated Chaban-Delmas in the first round, then narrowly defeated Mitterrand in the second. He was the first non-Gaullist President of the Fifth Republic.

Chirac became Prime minister and became the leader of the UDR in December 1974, in spite of the negative opinions of many historical Gaullist personalities (Michel Debré, Jacques Chaban-Delmas, etc.). They accused him of having betrayed the party during the previous presidential campaign. Some months later, a conflict broke out between the executive leadership and Chirac left the cabinet in August 1976.

Chirac-led neo-Gaullist party: RPR and UMP (1976–2007) 

In December 1976, the UDR was replaced by the Rally for the Republic (Rassemblement pour la République or RPR). This name was chosen due to its similarity with the RPF. Indeed, the New Gaullist Party was devised as a machine of reconquest behind one man, Jacques Chirac.

Without withdrawing from the presidential majority, the RPR criticized the executive duo of President Giscard d'Estaing and Prime minister Raymond Barre. In December 1978, six months before the 1979 European Parliament election, the Call of Cochin denounced the appropriation of France by "the foreign party", which sacrificed the national interests and the independence of the country in order to build a federal Europe. This accusation targeted clearly Giscard d'Estaing. The RPR contrasted the social doctrine of Gaullism to the president's liberalism.

The RPR supported Chirac in the 1981 presidential election but he was eliminated in the first round. He refused to give instructions for voting for the second round, even if he said "in a private capacity", he would vote for Giscard d'Estaing. In fact, the RPR was suspected of working for the defeat of the incumbent president.

While the Socialist Party leader François Mitterrand became president, the RPR gradually abandoned the Gaullist doctrine, adopting the European and liberal positions of the Union for French Democracy (Union pour la démocratie française or UDF). The two parties competed for the leadership of the right-wing opposition, but they presented a common list at the 1984 European Parliament election and a platform to prepare for winning the 1986 legislative election.

From 1986 to 1988, Chirac "cohabited" as Prime minister with Mitterrand, but lost the 1988 presidential election. After his defeat, his leadership was challenged by younger politicians who wished to renew the right. Furthermore, the abandonment of the Gaullist doctrine was criticized by Charles Pasqua and Philippe Séguin. They tried to remove him from the RPR leadership in 1990, in vain. However, the division re-appeared with the 1992 Maastricht referendum. Chirac voted "yes" whereas Séguin and Pasqua campaigned for "no".

The "Union for France", a RPR/UDF coalition, won the 1993 legislative election. Chirac refused to re-cohabit with Mitterrand, and his confidente Edouard Balladur became Prime minister. Balladur promised he would not be a candidate in the 1995 presidential election. Nevertheless, polls indicated Balladur was the favorite in the presidential race and furthermore, he was supported by the majority of right-wing politicians. He decided finally to be a candidate against Chirac. However, they claimed they remained "friends for 30 years".

The Socialists being weakened after the 14 years of Mitterrand's presidency, the main contest was the competition in the right, between Balladur and Chirac, two Neo-Gaullists. Balladur proposed a neoliberal programme and took advantage of the "positive results" of his cabinet, whereas Chirac advocated Keynesianism to reduce the "social fracture" and criticized the "dominant ideas", targeting Balladur. Chirac won the 1995 presidential election.

In November 1995, his Prime Minister Alain Juppé, "the best among us" according to Chirac, announced a plan of Welfare-State reforms which sparked wide social conflict. President Chirac dissolved the National Assembly and lost the 1997 legislative election. He was forced to cohabit with a left-wing cabinet led by Lionel Jospin until 2002.

Séguin succeeded Juppé as RPR leader. But, he criticized the ascendancy of President Chirac over the party. He resigned during the 1999 European election campaign, while Pasqua presented a dissident list to advocate the Gaullist idea of a "Europe of nations". Pasqua founded the Rally for France (Rassemblement pour la France or RPF) and obtained more votes than the RPR official list led by Nicolas Sarkozy. Michèle Alliot-Marie was elected RPR leader, against the wishes of President Chirac who supported another candidate.

Before the 2002 presidential election, RPR and non-RPR supporters of Chirac gathered in an association: the "Union on the move". It became the Union for the Presidential Majority (Union pour la majorité présidentielle or UMP) after the 21 April electoral shock. Chirac was re-elected and the new party won the legislative election. It was renamed Union for a Popular Movement a few months later, establishing the UMP as a permanent organization. Chirac finished his presidency in 2007 after 12 years ruled.

Nicolas Sarkozy era (2007–2017) 
 
Nicolas Sarkozy was elected President of France in 2007. During his leadership, the gaullist party shift to the right with more conservative policies. Sarkozy was defeated in 2012. Despite his defeat, Sarkozy remained influential in the party politics. He became then President of the UMP in 2014 and renamed the gaullist party into Republicans in 2015. However, in 2016, Sarkozy was defeated in the presidential primaries.

Laurent Wauquiez era (2017–present) 
 
Laurent Wauquiez was selected as leader of the Republicans in 2017. Since then the party has moved to further right.

Secretaries General 
 1947–1951: Jacques Soustelle
 1951–1954: Louis Terrenoire
 1958–1959: Roger Frey
 1959: Albin Chalandon
 1959–1961: Jacques Richard
 1961–1962: Roger Dusseaulx
 1962: Louis Terrenoire
 1962–1968: Jacques Baumel
 1968–1971: Robert Poujade
 1971–1972: René Tomasi
 1972–1973: Alain Peyrefitte
 1973–1974: Alexandre Sanguinetti
 1974–1975: Jacques Chirac
 1975: André Bord
 1975–1976: Yves Guéna

Presidents of RPR/UMP/LR 
 1976–1994: Jacques Chirac (1974-1976 and 1986-1988 served as Prime Minister of France, 1995-2007 served as President of France)
 1994–1997: Alain Juppé (1995-1997 served as Prime Minister of France)
 1997–1999: Philippe Séguin
 1999:      Nicolas Sarkozy
 1999–2002: Michèle Alliot-Marie

Presidents of UMP 
 2002–2004: Alain Juppé
 2004–2007: Nicolas Sarkozy (2007–2012, served as President of the French Republic; during the Sarkozy presidency, the president of UMP was vacant and led by Secretary-General)
 2012–2014: Jean-François Copé
 2014–2015: Nicolas Sarkozy

Presidents of LR 
 2015–2016: Nicolas Sarkozy
 2016–2019: Laurent Wauquiez
 2019–present: Christian Jacob

References 
 Berstein, Serge, Histoire du gaullisme, Perrin, Paris, 2001.

Charles de Gaulle
Politics of France
Conservative parties in France
Nationalism in France